Vitaly Valeryevich Makarov (born June 23, 1974 in Teguldet, Tomsk Oblast, Russia) is a Russian judoka who competed in the men's lightweight category. He was a 2004 Olympic silver medalist, 2001 World Champion, and earned medals in several other international tournaments. He was a 1994 World Junior Champion and has been a coach on the Russian national judo team.

Biography
Makarov is considered to be one of the best Russian judokas. He started judo when is father offered to take him to practice, who believed he had talent at the sport. At the 1994 Junior World Judo Championships in Cairo, Egypt, Makarov won his first international competition, and later that year got a silver medal at the Junior European Championships. In Birmingham in 1999, he missed his chance to become World Champion after losing to Jimmy Pedro of the United States in the final. In the 2000 Summer Olympics he was defeated in the first match by Askhat Shakharov of Kazakhstan. But in 2001 Makarov famously defeated Yusuke Kanamaru of Japan to become World Champion. He won a silver medal in the lightweight (73 kg) division at the 2004 Summer Olympics after being defeated by Lee Won-hee of South Korea in the final due to competing with an injury. Since 2006 he has been coaching the Russian judo team, and trained other Russian judoka who competed at the 2008, 2012, 2016 Summer Olympics. He is also a coach on the Russian team for the 2020 Summer Olympics in Tokyo.

Personal life
He is married to Carmen Calvo, 3rd degree black belt, an official of the Spanish Judo Federation.

Achievements

References

External links
 

1974 births
Living people
People from Tuapse
Russian male judoka
Judoka at the 2000 Summer Olympics
Judoka at the 2004 Summer Olympics
Olympic judoka of Russia
Olympic silver medalists for Russia
Olympic medalists in judo
World judo champions
Medalists at the 2004 Summer Olympics
Sportspeople from Krasnodar Krai
20th-century Russian people
21st-century Russian people